Caste-related violence in India has occurred and continues to occur in various forms.

According to a report by Human Rights Watch: Discriminatory and cruel, inhuman, and degrading treatment of over 165 million people in India has been justified on the basis of caste. Caste is descent-based and hereditary in nature. It is a characteristic determined by one's birth into a particular caste, irrespective of the faith practiced by the individual. Caste denotes a traditional system of rigid social stratification into ranked groups defined by descent and occupation. Caste divisions in India dominate in housing, marriage, employment, and general social interaction-divisions that are reinforced through the practice and threat of social ostracism, economic boycotts, and physical violence.

Quoting about the atrocities that are committed by land holding communities on Untouchables, Author Dr. C. P. Yadav states that, "Atrocities are committed by the members of land holding castes, like Vellalas and Thevars in Tamil Nadu; by Kapus, Reddys and Kammas in Andhra Pradesh; by Marathas and Kunbis in Maharashtra; by Thakurs (Rajput), Bhumihars, Ahir, Kurmi and Kushwaha in Bihar; by Jats, Gurjars, Ahirs, Rajputs and Mauryas in Uttar Pradesh, Rajasthan and Madhya Pradesh; by Jats and Rajputs in Haryana and Punjab".

20th century

21st century

See also 
List of caste based violence in Bihar
Communalism (South Asia)
History of India
Human rights in India
Partition of India
Religion in India
Freedom of religion in India
Religious harmony in India
 Religious violence in India
1984 anti-Sikh riots
Violence against Christians in India
Violence against Muslims in India
Terrorism in India
Crime in India
Caste system in India
Scheduled Castes and Scheduled Tribes

References 

 
India crime-related lists
Dalit
India, Caste-Related Violence